The Rift is a best-selling novel written by Peter David. It was published in 1991.

Story
Official summary:

The story begins with Captain Pike, seen in the original pilot episode for Star Trek. It then features Captain Kirk and his crew from the future.

Mr. Spock learns his favorite word, "fascinating", from the female first officer known only as Number One, deciding it wasn't too emotional and would be a good word to remember for the future.

History of the book
David submitted three novel outlines to Paramount, written in three different styles.  The two he thought were good were rejected, and the one he said was "simply a conglomeration of old cliches from previous Star Trek episodes" was the only one they liked, and approved.  He has said that it was designed to make the other two look good, and wasn't designed to be the one they picked.

References

External links

Novels based on Star Trek: The Original Series
Novels by Peter David
1991 American novels